Paoletta is both an Italian surname and a given name. Notable people with the name include:

Jessica Paoletta (born 1988), Italian sprinter
Leonard S. Paoletta (born 1934), American lawyer and mayor
Mark Paoletta, American political consultant
Paoletta Magoni (born 1964), Italian alpine skier

Feminine given names
Italian feminine given names
Italian-language surnames